The Americas Zone was one of the three zones of the regional Davis Cup competition in 2000.

In the Americas Zone there were four different tiers, called groups, in which teams competed against each other to advance to the upper tier. The top two teams in Group IV advanced to the Americas Zone Group III in 2001. All other teams remained in Group IV.

Participating nations

Draw
 Venue: Club Hondureno Arabe, San Pedro Sula, Honduras
 Date: 13–19 March

  and  promoted to Group III in 2001.

Results

Barbados vs. U.S. Virgin Islands

Bermuda vs. Saint Lucia

Eastern Caribbean vs. Honduras

Antigua and Barbuda vs. U.S. Virgin Islands

Barbados vs. Eastern Caribbean

Bermuda vs. Honduras

Antigua and Barbuda vs. Saint Lucia

Barbados vs. Bermuda

Eastern Caribbean vs. U.S. Virgin Islands

Antigua and Barbuda vs. Eastern Caribbean

Bermuda vs. U.S. Virgin Islands

Honduras vs. Saint Lucia

Antigua and Barbuda vs. Honduras

Barbados vs. Saint Lucia

Bermuda vs. Eastern Caribbean

Antigua and Barbuda v Bermuda

Barbados vs. Honduras

Saint Lucia vs. U.S. Virgin Islands

Antigua and Barbuda vs. Barbados

Eastern Caribbean vs. Saint Lucia

Honduras vs. U.S. Virgin Islands

References

External links
Davis Cup official website

Davis Cup Americas Zone
Americas Zone Group IV